Iqbal, Eqbal, Ikbal, or Eghbal may refer to:

Geography

Iran
Eqbal, Iran, a village in West Azerbaijan Province
Eqbaliyeh, a rural district
Eqbal-e Gharbi Rural District, a western provincial district in Qazvin
Eqbal-e Sharqi Rural District, an eastern provincial district in Qazvin

Pakistan
Various places named after the national poet Muhammad Iqbal:
Iqbal Manzil, mansion and birthplace of Muhammad Iqbal in Sialkot, Punjab
Iqbal Park, a park in Lahore
Iqbal Stadium, a cricket ground in Faisalabad
Iqbal Town, Lahore, a commercial and residential locality in south-western Lahore
Allama Iqbal International Airport, Lahore
Allama Iqbal Medical College, Lahore

Other uses
Eqbal a Persian-language reformist newspaper published in Iran until 2005
Iqbal (film), a 2005 Indian film
Iqbal (name), a given name and surname
Iqbal (politician) (born 1954), Indian politician

See also
Ashcroft v. Iqbal, a 2008 United States Supreme Court case
Twiqbal, a portmanteau relaed to the case

Arabic-language surnames
Arabic masculine given names
Masculine given names
Pakistani masculine given names
Bengali Muslim surnames